The Consumer Electronics Hall of Fame, founded by the Consumer Electronics Association (CEA), honors leaders whose creativity, persistence, determination and personal charisma helped to shape the industry and made the consumer electronics marketplace what it is today. According to the CEA, the Consumer Electronics Hall of Fame inductees have made a significant contribution to the world, and without these people, people's lives would not be the same.

The CEA announced the first 50 inductees into the Hall of Fame at the 2000 International Consumer Electronics Show. The first class of inductees was in 2000. Each year another group of inventors, engineers, business leaders, retailers and journalists are inducted into the Consumer Electronics Hall of Fame.

Inductees

2000 

 Benjamin Abrams
 Robert Adler
 Edwin Armstrong
 John Logie Baird
 William Balderston
 John Bardeen
 Alexander Graham Bell
 Andre Blay
 Walter Brattain
 Karl Ferdinand Braun
 Nolan Bushnell
 Powel Crosley Jr.
 Lee DeForest
 Ray Dolby
 Allen DuMont
 Thomas Edison
 Carl Eilers
 Philo T. Farnsworth
 Reginald Aubrey Fessenden
 Avery Fisher
 Frank Freimann
 Paul Galvin
 Charles Ginsburg
 Peter Goldmark
 Dr. Sidney Harman
 Heinrich Hertz
 Masaru Ibuka
 Eldridge Johnson
 Jack Kilby
 Henry Kloss
 John Koss Sr.
 David Lachenbruch
 James B. Lansing
 Saul Marantz
 Guglielmo Marconi
 Konosuke Matsushita
 Cmdr. Eugene McDonald Jr.
 Akio Morita
 Robert Noyce
 Alexander M. Poniatoff
 Ed Roberts
 David Sarnoff
 Hermon Hosmer Scott
 Yuma Shiraishi
 William Shockley
 Ross Siragusa Sr.
 Shizuo Takano
 Nikola Tesla
 Jack Wayman
 Vladimir Zworykin

2001 

 Emil Berliner
 Sir John Ambrose Fleming
 Hugo Gernsback
 Peter Laurits Jensen
 Earl Muntz
 Valdemar Poulsen
 George Westinghouse

2002 

 Ernst F.W. Alexanderson
 Bernard Appel
 W.G.B. Baker
 William E. Boss
 Richard Ekstract
 Walter Fisher
 Raymond Gates
 William Powell Lear
 Sol Polk
 Jack K. Sauter

2003 

 Herbert Borchardt
 Leonard Feldman
 Kees A. Schouhamer Immink
 William Kasuga
 Atwater Kent
 Jules Steinberg
 Kenjiro Takayanagi
 Joseph Tushinsky
 Alan Wurtzel

2004 

 Alan Dower Blumlein
 Henry Brief
 Robert E. Gerson
 Ken Kai
 Jerry Kalov
 Paul Klipsch
 Norio Ohga
 Dr. Woo Paik
 Steven Wozniak
 Wireless Team: Richard Frenkiel and Joel S. Engel

2005 

 Ken Crane
 Joseph Donahue
 Harry Elias
 George Fezell
 Saul Gold
 Art Levis
 Jack Luskin
 Masaharu Matsushita
 John Winegard
 Engineering Team: William Hewlett and David Packard

2006 

 Dr. Donald Bitzer
 John F. Doyle
 Robert Galvin
 Andrew S. Grove
 George Heilmeier
 Dr. Nicholas Holonyak
 Howard Ladd
 Gordon Moore
 A.J. Richard
 John Roach
 H. Gene Slottow
 Robert Willson

2007 

 Paul Allen
 Dr. Amar Bose
 Dr. Karlheinz Brandenburg
 William G. Crutchfield, Jr.
 James Edward Day
 Dr. Heinz Gerhäuser
 John McDonald
 Steven Sasson
 Richard Schulze
 Dr. Dieter Seitzer
 Art Weinberg

2008 

 Ken Kutaragi
 Dean Dunlavey
 Joe Clayton
 Warren Lieberfarb
 Richard Sharp
 Dr. Fritz Sennheiser
 Engineering Team: Martin Cooper and Donald Linder
 Eddy Hartenstein
 Retailing Team: Jewel Abt and David Abt
 Hans Fantel

2009 

 Maurice Cohen
 Norman Cohen
 Philip Cohen
 Joseph Flaherty
 Karl Hassel
 Irwin M. Jacobs
 Steve Jobs
 Ralph Mathews
 Aaron Neretin
 John Shalam
 Walton Stinson
 Neil Terk
 Richard E. Wiley

2010 

 Dr. Lauren Christopher
 Dr. Ivan Getting
 Richard Kraft
 Frank McCann
 David Mondry
 Eugene Mondry
 Dr. Bradford Parkinson
 Frederik Philips
 Al Sotoloff
 Cynthia Upson
 Dr. Larry Weber

References

External links 
List of inductees 

Consumer electronics